Vice-Admiral Craig Alan Baines  is a retired senior Royal Canadian Navy officer who served as Commander of the Royal Canadian Navy from 2021 to 2022.

Personal
Baines hails from Saskatchewan and before his military career was a national judo medallist and graduate from the University of Manitoba.

Military career

He was appointed Commander Canadian Fleet Atlantic in July 2014  before being promoted to Commander Maritime Forces Atlantic in 2017.

He joined Maritime Command in 1987 and completed the Forces Regular Officer Training Program. He served as navigation officer on a number of ships before completing an operations course.

In 2010 he served as the base commander of Canadian Forces Base Esquimalt. This was followed by a stint as special advisor to the Chief of Defence Staff, after which he became fleet commander of Canadian Fleet Atlantic.

He became Commander of the Royal Canadian Navy on January 12, 2021. He stood down in May 2022 pending retirement, and retired in late 2022.

Post military career
In October 2022, it was announced that Baines had joined Modest Tree as a strategic advisor, for the company’s efforts in the marine, aerospace and defence industries.

Controversies
Baines apologised after it was reported that he had played golf with General Jonathan Vance while the latter was under investigation for alleged abuse towards female military staff.

Honours and decorations

Baines's personal awards and decorations included the following:

110px

110px

 Command Commendation

Notes

References

External links

|-

Living people
Canadian admirals
Commanders of the Royal Canadian Navy
Year of birth missing (living people)
University of Manitoba alumni
Commanders of the Order of Military Merit (Canada)
Canadian military personnel from Saskatchewan